Future of Wrestling was a professional wrestling promotion based in Fort Lauderdale, Florida from 1998 to 2003 and in Davie, Florida from 2011 to 2013. Former employees in FOW consisted of professional wrestlers, managers, play-by-play and color commentators, announcers, interviewers and referees.

Alumni

Male wrestlers

Female wrestlers

Stables and tag teams

Managers and valets

Commentators and interviewers

Referees

Other personnel

References
General

Specific

External links
Future of Wrestling alumni at TheFOW.com
Future of Wrestling alumni at Cagematch.net
Future of Wrestling alumni at Wrestlingdata.com

Future of Wrestling alumni